Layla Majnun is a 2021 Indonesian drama film directed by Monty Tiwa, written by Alim Sudio and Monty Tiwa and starring Acha Septriasa, Reza Rahadian and Baim Wong.

Cast 
 Acha Septriasa as Laila
 Reza Rahadian as Qais / Majnun
 Baim Wong as Ibnu Salam
 Dian Nitami as Fatmi
 Beby Tsabina as Narmina
 Uli Herdinansyah as Ilham Ismail
 Natasha Rizki as Niken
 Eriska Rein as Ailin
 Landung Simatupang as Ahmadi Ruslan
 August Melasz as Wisnu Salam
 Chantiq Schagerl as Winda
 Cut Ashifa as Nita
 Aida Cabiyeva as Sabina Kerimli
 Angelia Livie as young Layla
 Murad Ismayil as Rashad Mansurov

Release
It was released on February 11, 2021 on Netflix streaming.

Accolades

References

External links 
 
 

2021 films
Indonesian drama films
2020s Indonesian-language films
Indonesian-language Netflix original films
Films directed by Monty Tiwa